The Chitral Campaign: A Narrative of events in Chitral, Swat and Bajour is a book narrating the turbulent account of history in Chitral following the death of it Chief Aman ul-Mulk, the subsequent Siege of Chitral and the Chitral Expedition. The book was written by Harry Craufuird Thomson with its first edition published by Heinemann Publishers in London in 1895.

References

1895 non-fiction books
Military books
Chitral
Sieges involving British India